Andy Culligan is a Canadian retired professional ice hockey player. He was selected by the Chicago Blackhawks in the first round (second overall) of the 1965 NHL Amateur Draft.

Culligan played with the Port Huron Flags in the International Hockey League (IHL) during the 1968–69 season. He later played Canadian college hockey with St. Francis Xavier University.

References

External links

Canadian ice hockey forwards
Chicago Blackhawks draft picks
Living people
National Hockey League first-round draft picks
Port Huron Flags players
Year of birth missing (living people)